Wriston is an unincorporated community in Fayette County, West Virginia, United States.

The community was named after Martha Taylor Wriston.

References 

Unincorporated communities in West Virginia
Unincorporated communities in Fayette County, West Virginia